The Championnat National 3, commonly referred to as simply National 3 and formerly known as  Championnat de France Amateur 2, is a football league competition. The league serves as the fifth division of the French football league system behind Ligue 1, Ligue 2, Championnat National, and the Championnat National 2. Usually contested by 168 clubs, the Championnat National 3 operates on a system of promotion and relegation with the Championnat National 2 and the regional leagues of the Division d'Honneur, the sixth division of French football. Seasons run from August to May, with teams in twelve groups playing 26 games each totalling 2080 games in the season. Most games are played on Saturdays and Sundays, with a few games played during weekday evenings. Play is regularly suspended the last weekend before Christmas for two weeks before returning in the second week of January.

The competition was founded in 1993 as National 3 and lasted for five years before being converted to Championnat de France Amateur 2 in 1998. In 2017 the FFF reorganised amateur football and the restructured 5th level again became Championnat National 3. Some clubs that participate in the league are semi-professional. The matches in the league attract on average between 200 and 400 spectators per match.

History and format
The amateur championship of France was created in 1993 under the name National 3, replacing the former Division 4. The league's debut coincided with the creation of the Championnat National, the third division of French football, which is commonly known as National. For the first three years of the competition, an amateur champion was crowned in France regardless of whether the club was amateur or a reserve team.

In 1998 the competition was renamed Championnat de France Amateur 2 as part of a restructuring of Amateur football. In this guise, the competition saw 112 clubs participate, split into eight parallel groups of 14 with their group affiliation being based on the regional location of the club. The league became open to reserve teams in France and amateur clubs in France and both were eligible for promotion to the Championnat de France Amateur.

Current format
In 2017 the FFF reorganised amateur football along the lines of the 2016 reorganisation of the Regions of France, creating Championnat National 2 and Championnat National 3 to replace CFA and CFA2. For National 2 this was in effect just a change of name, whilst National 3 saw a major restructure. This new competition sees 168 clubs participating, in twelve parallel groups directly aligned to the thirteen new regions (Corsica is merged with Provence-Alpes-Côte d'Azur to form a Méditerranee-Corse group). The administration of the league is devolved to the regional leagues on a group by group basis, with the exception of the ''Méditerranee-Corse group, which is directly managed by the FFF.

During the course of a season, usually from August to May, each club plays the others in their respective group twice, once at their home stadium and once at that of their opponents, for a total of 26 games. Teams are ranked by total points. Ties between clubs with equal points are resolved by: a) points gained in games between the two (or more) clubs, b) goal difference in games between the two (or more) clubs, c) overall goal difference, d) goals scored, e) best disciplinary record, f) drawing of lots.

At the end of each season, the winner of each group is promoted to Championnat National 2. If a group winner is prevented from being promoted, or elects not to be promoted, they are replaced by the next best team in the group who are eligible. At least the bottom three teams in each group are relegated to the Regional league's top division. In the case of groups which start a season with more than 14 teams, extra relegation places will ensure the league conforms to 14 teams for the following season. Extra relegation places will also be added depending on which regional groups the teams relegated from Championnat National 2 will enter the following season.

Uncompleted seasons
Two consecutive seasons, 2019–20 and 2020–21, were not completed due to the COVID-19 pandemic in France. Standings of the 2019–20 season were finalised based on points per game, whilst the 2020–21 season was declared void.

External links
Official FFF site

References

 
5
Sports leagues established in 1993
1993 establishments in France
Fra